Lizzy Claydon  (born 11 November 1972) is an Australian former footballer who played as a forward for the Australia women's national soccer team. She was part of the team at the 1995 FIFA Women's World Cup. At the club level, she played for Stirling Vasto in Australia.

References

1972 births
Living people
Australian women's soccer players
Australia women's international soccer players
Place of birth missing (living people)
1995 FIFA Women's World Cup players
Women's association football forwards